Rebecca Singh (born 28 January 1975) is a Fijian-born news presenter on the television station, TV3.

She was born in Fiji and grew up in Nadi where her father worked as a communications officer at Nadi International Airport. She was educated at Jasper Williams High School and the University of the South Pacific. She joined Fiji Television and rose up the ranks to become a presenter for the evening news.  She is now the weekend anchor of 3 News.

After the political upheavals of 2000, she left Fiji and joined TV3 in 2001 beginning work as a reporter, producer, presenter and foreign editor. After a brief stint away from TV3, working for Livingstone Productions, she returned in 2004 to produce Nightline and now does environmental reporting as well as presenting.

She contributes to cultural activities organised by the local Fiji Indian community. She has hosted the Bollywood Dance Competition which is a part of the Diwali Festival.

Personal life
In 2008, she entered into a civil partnership with her girlfriend of 5 years, Kelly Rice.

References 

People from Nadi
Fijian Hindus
Fijian emigrants to New Zealand
University of the South Pacific alumni
New Zealand television journalists
Living people
1975 births
New Zealand Hindus
LGBT Hindus
New Zealand LGBT journalists
Fijian LGBT people